Workmen's Compensation (Agriculture) Convention, 1921 is  an International Labour Organization Convention.

It was established in 1921:
Having decided upon the adoption of certain proposals with regard to the protection of agricultural workers against accident, ...

Modification 
The principles contained in the convention were subsequently revised and included in ILO Convention C121, Employment Injury Benefits Convention, 1964.

Ratifications
As of 2013, the convention has been ratified by 77 states. It has subsequently been denounced by one of these states, Uruguay.

External links 
Text.
Ratifications.

Workmen's
Treaties concluded in 1921
Treaties entered into force in 1923
Agricultural treaties
Treaties of the People's Republic of Angola
Treaties of Antigua and Barbuda
Treaties of Argentina
Treaties of Australia
Treaties of Austria
Treaties of the Bahamas
Treaties of Barbados
Treaties of Belgium
Treaties of Belize
Treaties of Bosnia and Herzegovina
Treaties of the Second Brazilian Republic
Treaties of the Kingdom of Bulgaria
Treaties of Burundi
Treaties of Chile
Treaties of Colombia
Treaties of the Comoros
Treaties of Cuba
Treaties of Croatia
Treaties of Czechoslovakia
Treaties of the Czech Republic
Treaties of the Republic of the Congo (Léopoldville)
Treaties of Denmark
Treaties of Djibouti
Treaties of Dominica
Treaties of El Salvador
Treaties of Estonia
Treaties of Fiji
Treaties of the French Third Republic
Treaties of Gabon
Treaties of the Weimar Republic
Treaties of Grenada
Treaties of Guinea-Bissau
Treaties of Guyana
Treaties of Haiti
Treaties of the Hungarian People's Republic
Treaties of the Irish Free State
Treaties of the Kingdom of Italy (1861–1946)
Treaties of Kenya
Treaties of Latvia
Treaties of Luxembourg
Treaties of Madagascar
Treaties of Malawi
Treaties of the Federation of Malaya
Treaties of Malaysia
Treaties of Malta
Treaties of Mauritius
Treaties of Mexico
Treaties of Montenegro
Treaties of Morocco
Treaties of the Netherlands
Treaties of New Zealand
Treaties of Nicaragua
Treaties of Norway
Treaties of Panama
Treaties of Papua New Guinea
Treaties of Peru
Treaties of the Second Polish Republic
Treaties of the Estado Novo (Portugal)
Treaties of Rwanda
Treaties of Saint Lucia
Treaties of Saint Vincent and the Grenadines
Treaties of Senegal
Treaties of Serbia and Montenegro
Treaties of Singapore
Treaties of Slovakia
Treaties of Slovenia
Treaties of the Solomon Islands
Treaties of the Second Spanish Republic
Treaties of Eswatini
Treaties of Sweden
Treaties of Tanganyika
Treaties of North Macedonia
Treaties of Tunisia
Treaties of Uganda
Treaties of the United Kingdom
Treaties of Yugoslavia
Treaties of Zambia
Treaties extended to Curaçao and Dependencies
Treaties extended to the Territory of Papua and New Guinea
Treaties extended to the Belgian Congo
Treaties extended to Ruanda-Urundi
Treaties extended to the Faroe Islands
Treaties extended to French Comoros
Treaties extended to French Somaliland
Treaties extended to French Guiana
Treaties extended to French Polynesia
Treaties extended to Guadeloupe
Treaties extended to Martinique
Treaties extended to New Caledonia
Treaties extended to Réunion
Treaties extended to Saint Pierre and Miquelon
Treaties extended to the West Indies Federation
Treaties extended to the Colony of the Bahamas
Treaties extended to British Honduras
Treaties extended to Bermuda
Treaties extended to the British Virgin Islands
Treaties extended to Brunei (protectorate)
Treaties extended to the Falkland Islands
Treaties extended to the Colony of Fiji
Treaties extended to the Gambia Colony and Protectorate
Treaties extended to Gibraltar
Treaties extended to Guernsey
Treaties extended to British Guiana
Treaties extended to British Kenya
Treaties extended to Jersey
Treaties extended to the Federation of Rhodesia and Nyasaland
Treaties extended to the Gilbert and Ellice Islands
Treaties extended to the Crown Colony of Malta
Treaties extended to the Isle of Man
Treaties extended to British Mauritius
Treaties extended to Saint Helena, Ascension and Tristan da Cunha
Treaties extended to the Colony of Sarawak
Treaties extended to the Crown Colony of Singapore
Treaties extended to the British Solomon Islands
Treaties extended to Swaziland (protectorate)
Treaties extended to the Uganda Protectorate
Treaties extended to the Sultanate of Zanzibar
1921 in labor relations